Arthur Roland Humberstone (17 April 1912 – 31 December 1999) was a British animator, artist and director, whose credits included Animal Farm, Yellow Submarine and The BFG.

He worked with Halas & Batchelor and as a senior animator with Martin Rosen on Watership Down and The Plague Dogs.

Arthur Humberstone's influence on the film Watership Down is discussed in the chapter "Revisiting the production of Watership Down through the Arthur Humberstone Animation Archive" in the book Watership Down: Perspectives On and Beyond Animated Violence.

Filmography

References

External links 
 Arthur Humberstone on IMDb

1912 births
1999 deaths
British animators
British animated film directors
British television directors
British cartoonists